Aldo Parecchini (born 21 December 1950) is a retired Italian road bicycle racer. As an amateur he competed in the individual road race at the 1972 Summer Olympics. Between 1973 and 1980 he rode professionally and rode the Tour de France in 1974 and 1976; in 1976 he won stage 6.

Major results

1972
Milano – Busseto
1976
Tour de France:
Winner stage 6
1977
Pietra Ligure

References

External links 
Official Tour de France results for Aldo Parecchini

1950 births
Living people
Italian male cyclists
Italian Tour de France stage winners
Cyclists at the 1972 Summer Olympics
Olympic cyclists of Italy
Cyclists from the Province of Brescia